Denilson Costa (born 10 June 1968, in São João de Meriti) is a Brazilian and naturalized Honduran football coach and former player.

He is currently the second all-time top scorer in the Honduran Liga Nacional and was also the first to reach 150 goals. Now he is a teacher in Honduras. Costa along with Marcelo Ferreira are among the only naturalized Honduran nationals to have played for the Honduras national football team.

Club career
Born in Brazil, Denilson moved to Honduras in 1991 and made his league debut in September 1991 for Olimpia against Súper Estrella, scoring the only goal of the game. He spent his entire career in Honduras, except for short spells in Costa Rica with Limonense for whom he scored the fastest goal in Costa Rica's premier division history in December 1990 and Belén and in Guatemala with Heredia. He finished his playing career at Necaxa to become the club's manager a few seasons later.

He played 481 matches is Honduran professional football, which is still a record.

International career
Denilson made his debut for his adopted home country Honduras in an October 2003 friendly match against Bolivia and has earned a total of 5 caps, scoring no goals.

His final international was a March 2005 friendly against the USA.

Managerial career
On 6 March 2011, Costa made his professional debut as coach with C.D. Necaxa in the 0–1 home defeat against F.C. Motagua.

Personal life
Denilson married Costa Rican Mirta Yorleni Ortiz whom he met while playing in Limón. She is a niece of former Costa Rican international Enrique Rivers. He became a Honduran citizen in 2002.

Honours

Player
C.D. Olimpia
Liga Profesional de Honduras: 1992–93, 1998–99, 2000–01 A, 2002–03 A
C.D. Marathón
Liga Profesional de Honduras: 2002–03 C, 2004–05 A

References

External links

 DENILSON COSTA SE CASÓ CON LA SOBRINA DE ENRIQUE RIVERS - Diario Extra

1968 births
Living people
People from São João de Meriti
Honduran people of Brazilian descent
Brazilian emigrants to Honduras
Naturalised citizens of Honduras
Association football forwards
Brazilian footballers
Honduran footballers
Honduras international footballers
Belén F.C. players
C.D. Olimpia players
F.C. Motagua players
C.D. Marathón players
Platense F.C. players
Atlético Olanchano players
Liga FPD players
Honduran expatriate footballers
Expatriate footballers in Costa Rica
Expatriate footballers in Honduras
Expatriate footballers in Guatemala
Liga Nacional de Fútbol Profesional de Honduras players
Honduran football managers
Sportspeople from Rio de Janeiro (state)